The 2008 Guangzhou International Women's Open (also known as the TOE Life Ceramics Guangzhou International Women's Open for sponsorship reasons) was a tennis tournament on outdoor hard courts. It was the 5th edition of the Guangzhou International Women's Open, and was part of the Tier III Series of the 2008 WTA Tour. It took place in Guangzhou, People's Republic of China, from September 15 through September 21, 2008.

Champions

Singles

 Vera Zvonareva defeated  Peng Shuai,  6–7(4–7), 6–0, 6–2
 It was Vera Zvonareva's 2nd title of the year, and her 7th overall.

Doubles

 Mariya Koryttseva /  Tatiana Poutchek defeated  Sun Tiantian /  Yan Zi, 6–3, 4–6, [10–8]

External links
 Official website
 Singles, Doubles and Qualifying Singles Draws

Guangzhou International Women's Open
2008
G